Alejandro Rey (February 8, 1930 – May 21, 1987) was an Argentine-American actor and television director.

Career

Early work
Rey was born in Buenos Aires and studied acting under Hedwig Schlichter and Milagros de la Vega. He became known as an actor in Argentine movies. In 1957, he participated in the film El Diablo de vacaciones, directed by Ferruccio Cerio, with Nelly Panizza and Ana María Cassan, embarking on the ship Yapeyu to travel around the world, but filming did not conclude. In 1960, he began working with Ana Casares forming the main couple of the television program María Trastorno y yo, but within three months, production had to be interrupted, after he was hired in the United States for a small role in Battle at Bloody Beach.

1960 to 1986
Rey was most famous for his roles in movies such as Fun in Acapulco with Elvis Presley (1963), where his time on screen corresponds to that of a starring role. On television, he had memorable supporting and leading roles in two episodes of Thriller titled "Guillotine" (1961) and "La Strega" (1962). In 1961, he made a guest appearance on the courtroom series Perry Mason as murder victim and title character Vincent Danielli in "The Case of the Injured Innocent".

Rey's best known role was that of casino owner and playboy Carlos Ramirez on the television series The Flying Nun (1967–70), which became an international success. He played a South American patriot in the Voyage to the Bottom of the Sea episode "The Mist of Silence". He portrayed a Spanish sergeant on a 1966 episode of Daniel Boone. He also appeared in a season one episode of The Fugitive titled "Smoke Screen".  He appeared in an episode of Route 66, as a jai alai player in Florida and brother to one of Fidel Castro's junior officers, hoping to be reunited with his brother.

Rey's only credited lead in a film was in The Stepmother (1972).  He remained busy on television, playing the role of Karl Duval on Days of Our Lives from 1976 to 1977. He was also a frequent panelist on the game shows Tattletales, He Said, She Said, Hollywood Squares and Match Game. He appeared as part of an ensemble cast in William Peter Blatty's film The Ninth Configuration (1980). In 1986, he played Captain Luis Rueda on Dallas. He also directed for television, with credits on Villa Allegre, The Facts of Life and Mary Hartman, Mary Hartman.

Personal
Rey emigrated to the United States in 1960, and became a naturalized citizen of the United States in 1967 while appearing in The Flying Nun. On an episode of Tattletales, he said that his first marriage lasted "for 7 days". He married Joyce Bowman on May 24, 1969, in Los Angeles. She was the adopted daughter of attorney and long-time president of the Santa Ana School District Frank Bowman and his wife Dorothy. They had one son, Brandon.

Death
Rey died from lung cancer on May 21, 1987, at Cedars-Sinai Medical Center at age 57. He is buried at the Holy Cross Cemetery in Culver City, California.

Filmography

Movies

Television

References

External links

 
 
 
 

1930 births
1987 deaths
American male soap opera actors
Argentine emigrants to the United States
Argentine male television actors
Burials at Holy Cross Cemetery, Culver City
Deaths from lung cancer in California
Male actors from Buenos Aires
20th-century American male actors
Fellows of the American Physical Society